Ross Enbom (4 April 1948 – 17 May 2008) was  a former Australian rules footballer who played with Fitzroy in the Victorian Football League (VFL).

Notes

External links 		
		
		
		
		
		
		
		
1948 births		
2008 deaths		
Australian rules footballers from Victoria (Australia)		
Fitzroy Football Club players